Jonathan Manns MBE is a British town planner and surveyor. He is a writer, speaker, educator and campaigner on built environment issues.

Research & Proposals 
Manns has been described as "the pre-eminent British planner of his generation", "[one] of Britain's foremost urbanists" and "someone who has made a lasting and positive impact on communities and the built environment". He has been involved with many of London's tall buildings and contributed extensively to discussions around the management of land for housing. His work has attracted international interest and he has proposed reforms to several key policy areas.

Housing crisis
Manns has written extensively on the UK housing crisis. In 2017 he established the "House Me Now" campaign which crowd-funded the distribution of 2000 pass-it-on pamphlets around London to raise awareness of solutions amongst ordinary Londoners of possible solutions and to begin a social media debate. In 2018, on behalf of the campaign, he signed an open letter, submitted by Siobhan McDonagh MP, to the UK Government, calling for the release of land close to transport nodes for development.

Green belt
Manns' work on Green Belts is cited widely. In 2014 he authored a history of the emergence of London's green belt, which said that it should not be treated as sacrosanct and set out the historical precedent for reform. He has subsequently supported work by the London School of Economics  and in 2016 put forward the concept of a "Green Web" whereby new development would be accompanied by environmental enhancements and contribute to a net gain in biodiversity. Manns' commentary on Green Belts has at times attracted criticisms: both that property professionals make unconvincing champions for reform  and that his varied public profile constitutes a form of lobbying (a criticism which has itself attracted attention ). He has always stated his view that "public policy should be adaptable and that the emphasis should be firmly on securing the best outcomes. It should be possible to consider both whether the overall effects are beneficial and whether there is scope for improvement. If opportunities exist to deliver development more sustainably, the ability to explore and realise this should not be prevented by dogmatic defence of the status quo. England's green belt should not be off the table for appraisal and, if appropriate, amendment."

Suburbs
The UK Parliament announced a "Suburban Taskforce" in March 2020, to be co-chaired by Rupa Huq MP and David Simmonds MP. It is formed from a cross-party group of politicians "to shine a light on the suburbs in order to identify and secure the clear, long-term and properly resourced policies needed to support thriving, sustainable and inclusive suburban areas". The Advisory Board was announced in August 2020, with Manns named as its Chair. The report was published in September 2022.

West London Orbital
Manns co-authored an analysis of growth options for the UK Government's All Party Parliamentary Group for London's Planning and Built Environment, in which he proposed new orbital rail links in West London, connecting existing communities and those which could accommodate additional growth. It encouraged West London Alliance to reconsider work it had commissioned in 2001 which flagged the scope to connect Old Oak Common and Brent Cross along the Dudding Hill line. This was agreed at the following meeting of the West London Economic Prosperity Board, in December 2016, and the Board voted to engage the Mayor of London around a West London Orbital in June 2017, which the Mayor committed himself to delivering in March 2018.

Land measurement
He was commissioned by the Royal Institution of Chartered Surveyors to prepare the first international guidance on the measurement of land and calculation of associated metrics such as density. On publication these definitions established, for the first time, a global standard for all land measurements around the world. A draft was released for consultation in 2019. The Guidance was published in 2021.

Advocacy & Affiliations 
In 2016 he was invited to co-launch the Open City "Green Sky Thinking" week.  He teaches at UCL and is on the Editorial Board for the Journal of Urban Regeneration and Renewal. He is a Fellow of the Royal Society of Arts (FRSA), the Royal Geographical Society (FRGS), the Royal Town Planning Institute (FRTPI) and the Royal Institution of Chartered Surveyors (FRICS). He is believed to be the youngest person to have been awarded Fellowship of the RTPI, and also of both the RTPI and RICS.

Political advocacy
In 2015, Manns was Convenor of the UK Government's All Party Parliamentary Group for London's Planning and Built Environment. The purpose of the APPG is "to explore the social, economic and environmental issues affecting London at a strategic level and build consensus as to the ways in which these might be addressed." The group, chaired by Rupa Huq MP, has since discussed matters from the Green Belt to the Grenfell Fire.

Public advocacy
Manns is a trustee of the London Society, which was founded in 1912 to promote debate around London's built environment with members of the public. He is on the Advisory Board for the Patchwork Foundation, which seeks to engage those from non-traditional backgrounds in politics and civil society. He also assisted with the Long Live Southbank campaign to protect and extend London's historic skate spot.

Personal life 
Manns read Planning, Growth and Regeneration at Girton College, Cambridge. He was appointed a Member of the Most Excellent Order of the British Empire (MBE) in the Queen's Birthday Honours 2022 "for services to Planning, Real Estate and to Built Environments".

References 

Year of birth missing (living people)
Living people
British urban planners
Fellows of the Royal Geographical Society